Sebastian Tobias "Toby" Caston (July 17, 1965 – October 2, 1994) was a professional American football player who played linebacker in the National Football League (NFL) for seven seasons for the Houston Oilers and Detroit Lions. He played college football at Louisiana State University for the LSU Tigers football team. He was killed in a road accident.

References

1965 births
1994 deaths
Houston Oilers players
Detroit Lions players
LSU Tigers football players
Sportspeople from Monroe, Louisiana
Road incident deaths in Texas